Keane William Lewis-Potter (born 22 February 2001) is an English professional footballer who plays as a forward for Premier League club Brentford.

Club career
Lewis-Potter made his senior debut for Hull City in January 2019 when he came on as a substitute in an FA Cup match against Milwall. In March 2019, Lewis-Potter went on loan to Bradford (Park Avenue) for the remainder of the 2018–19 season.

On 9 November 2019, Lewis-Potter made his league debut for Hull City when he came on as an 89th-minute substitute for Leonardo Lopes in the 1–0 home loss to West Bromwich Albion. On 30 November 2019, he came on as a substitute for Callum Elder and scored the only Hull goal and his first professional goal in a 3–1 defeat to Barnsley.

On 18 January 2021, Lewis-Potter signed a new contract with Hull City until summer 2023.

Lewis-Potter ended the 2020–21 season as Hull's 3rd top scorer with his 13 goals helping Hull City claim the League One title.

On 3 May 2022, Lewis-Potter was awarded three player of the season awards for Hull City; the players player of the season, fans player of the season and the player of the season chosen by Hull City manager Shota Arveladze.

Brentford
On 12 July 2022, Premier League club Brentford announced the signing of Lewis-Potter on a six-year contract, for an undisclosed fee.

International career
In March 2022, Lewis-Potter received a first international call-up to the England under-21 squad for the upcoming 2023 UEFA European Under-21 Championship qualification fixtures.
He made his debut when coming on as an 82nd-minute substitute for Noni Madueke against Albania.

Career statistics

Honours
Hull City
EFL League One: 2020–21

Individual
EFL Young Player of the Month: September 2020
Hull City Player of the Year: 2021–22
Hull City Players' Player of the Year: 2021–22
Hull City Supporters' Player of the Year: 2021–22

References

External links

Profile at the Brentford F.C. website
Profile at the Hull City A.F.C. website (Archived copy)

2001 births
Living people
Footballers from Kingston upon Hull
English footballers
Association football forwards
Hull City A.F.C. players
Bradford (Park Avenue) A.F.C. players
Brentford F.C. players
National League (English football) players
English Football League players
England under-21 international footballers
Premier League players